The 1944 WANFL season was the 60th season of the various incarnations of the Western Australian National Football League. Consequent upon the improved fortunes of the Allies in the Pacific War, the league's decision to restrict football to those under nineteen as of 1 October become somewhat controversial, but the WANFL after much debate during the early weeks of the season decided it would not raise the age limit or even as West Perth suggested allow four 1943 players over the limit to play. This meant that a large number of players who had been mainstays in the 1942 and 1943 seasons were no longer eligible to play, and as in 1943 a number of players still eligible were erratically available due to service in the war.

The 1944 season is notable for the first perfect season in the history of Western Australian league football, by East Perth. Under the coaching of former forward Cecil Rowland an exceptionally powerful core of players was developed from 1942 and 1943 mainstays including Frank Allen, Ken Wimbridge, Ray Perry, John “Todge” Campbell and Ron Brentnall, joined by outstanding talents in full-forward Alan Watts, key position player Jim Washbourne and injury-plagued but talented rover Norm Gibbney. So well-equipped were the Royals that they did not suffer during the finals from the loss of best-and-fairest Campbell, ruckman Brentnall and Ron Frankish – instead fitting Northam defender Jack Leadbitter and Wesley rover Ernie England for their only games of the season and losing nothing in efficiency. At the other end of the ladder, South Fremantle, already last in 1943, lost their only class players in Frank Treasure and Erik Eriksson and became the first team since Midland Junction in 1917 to lose every match. The red and whites in fact never led during the second half in any of their nineteen matches, and officials were so desperate that a meeting of former players was called mid-season to revive the club's on-field fortunes – to no effect.

Apart from South Fremantle's winless season, Claremont suffered a huge loss when Claremont Oval, which had been their home ground since 1927, had its grandstand completely burnt down in a fire at 5:11 a.m. on 28 July. In the fire, which was estimated to have cost a total of £3000, all the records, jerseys and training equipment were lost, and Claremont were forced to play home matches at Subiaco Oval and the W.A.C.A. until 1948, despite financial donations by Collingwood to help rebuild the grandstand. The Tigers had to take the field in several games wearing East Perth guernseys, and suffered from the loss of key players such as Robin Farmer, consequently falling to second-last on the ladder.

Home-and-away season

Round 1

Round 2

Round 3

Round 4

Round 5

Round 6

Round 7

Round 8

Round 9

Round 10

Round 11

Round 12

Round 13

Round 14

Round 15

Round 16

Round 17

Round 18

Round 19

Ladder

Finals

First semi-final

First semi-final replay

Second semi-final

Preliminary final

Grand Final

Notes
The Claremont Showground, which would ordinarily have been available as an alternative Tiger home venue, were commandeered by the military between 1940 and 1944, and themselves burned in a fire in January 1945.

References

External links
Official WAFL website
Western Australian National Football League (WANFL), 1944

West Australian Football League seasons
WANFL